The Lower Neponset River Trail is a  rail trail running along the Neponset River in the Dorchester section of Boston, Massachusetts. It roughly follows the path of the eastern part of the Dorchester and Milton Branch Railroad from the Port Norfolk neighborhood in Dorchester to the Central Avenue T Station in Milton, passing through Pope John Paul II Park, the Neponset Marshes, and the Lower Mills area.

References

External links
Lower Neponset River Trail Department of Conservation and Recreation
Neponset River Greenway Map Department of Conservation and Recreation

Massachusetts natural resources
Protected areas of Massachusetts
Rail trails in Massachusetts